iii (stylized on the album cover as MiiiKE SN!!!W) is the third studio album by Swedish indie pop band Miike Snow. It was released in the United States on 4 March 2016.

Production
The band teased their third album, and its leadoff single "Heart Is Full", on social media on 19 October 2015. On 29 October 2015, the band debuted "Heart Is Full" on the radio station Beats 1. On 3 December 2015, the band debuted the album's second single, "Genghis Khan", and announced the release date of the album.

Singles
The first single to be taken from the album was "Heart Is Full", released on 30 October 2015, which debuted on Beats 1 the day before. The video for "Heart Is Full" was released on 11 November 2015. The music video was directed by Lance Drake. The second single, "Genghis Khan", was released on 3 December 2015.

The official music video for the album's fourth single, "My Trigger", was released on 22 August 2016. On 30 September 2016, the Mark Ronson remix of "Heart Is Full" was released. "The Heart of Me" was released as the fourth single in the United States on 15 November 2016 and is included in the soundtrack of the video game Forza Horizon 3.

Promotion
The band performed the songs "Heart Is Full" and "Genghis Khan" on Jimmy Kimmel Live! on 1 March 2016. In addition, they announced a tour in 2016 to promote the album. The tour began on 3 March 2016 and is scheduled to end on 29 July 2016. Specific dates within the tour are part of major music festivals, including Coachella, the Governors Ball Music Festival and Lollapalooza, as well as others. The band also performed at SXSW on 16 March 2016.

Critical reception

The album received generally favorable reviews upon release. , Metacritic assigned the album an average score of 68 on a normalized scale of 100. Entertainment Weekly praised the sound of the album, noting that "for Miike Snow, words are hardly the point. iii's guiding principle seems to be style over substance — and Miike Snow have that in spades." The Boston Globe gave a more mixed reaction to the album, saying "the album does offer some irresistible moments, but they evaporate quickly".

Track listing
All tracks produced by Miike Snow; "Genghis Khan" and "Back of the Car" co-produced by Henrik Jonback.

Sample credits
"My Trigger" contains elements from "Fruitman" by Kool & the Gang.
"Heart Is Full" contains elements from "Waiting for Charlie to Come Home" by Marlena Shaw.
"I Feel the Weight" contains elements from "In Too Deep" by Genesis.

Charts

References

2016 albums
Miike Snow albums
Universal Republic Records albums